Treignat is a commune in the Allier department in Auvergne-Rhône-Alpes in central France.

Geography
The Petite Creuse river has its source in the commune.

Population

See also
Communes of the Allier department

References

Communes of Allier
Allier communes articles needing translation from French Wikipedia